This is a list of museums in the United Arab Emirates.

Al Ahmadiya School
Al Ain National Museum
Al Eslah School Museum
Al Hisn Fort Museum
Anime Museum
Dubai Museum
Etihad Museum
Fujairah Heritage Village
Fujairah Museum
Guggenheim Abu Dhabi
Louvre Abu Dhabi
Saeed Al Maktoum House
Salsali Private Museum
Salwa Zeidan Gallery
Sharjah Art Museum
Sharjah Archaeology Museum
Sharjah Calligraphy Museum
Sharjah Classic Cars Museum
Sharjah Heritage Museum
Sharjah Museum of Islamic Civilization
Sharjah Maritime Museum
Sharjah Science Museum
Sheikh Obaid bin Thani House
Sheikh Zayed Palace Museum
Sword Art Museum
Sword Art Online Museum
Zayed National Museum
Tanki Online Museum
Carbon 12 Dubai
Call of Duty Museum
AL Murab’a police museum in AL Ain

See also
 List of museums
 Culture of the United Arab Emirates

Museums
 
United Arab Emirates
Museums
Museums
United Arab Emirates